Mungo McCallum Fairgrieve FRSE (1872-1937) was a Scottish educator, academic author and amateur meteorologist.

Life
He was born on 30 October 1872 in Saltcoats on the Ayrshire coast. He attended both Glasgow University (entering in 1890 and studying under Lord Kelvin) and then Peterhouse, Cambridge graduating MA in 1899.

In 1900 he began teaching Science at Eastbourne New College, then in 1903 returned to Scotland to Edinburgh Academy rising to Senior Master in 1913, retiring in 1935.

In 1910 he was elected a Fellow of the Royal Society of Edinburgh. His proposers were George Alexander Gibson, John Sturgeon Mackay,  Peter Pinkerton and Andrew Watt. At this time he is listed as living at 67 Great King Street, a prestigious address in Edinburgh's Second New Town.

He was Vice President of the Scottish Meteorological Society and Scottish Secretary of the British Meteorological Society.

A keen mountaineer, he was crippled by a serious fall in 1935, his second serious accident in ten years.
He died in Edinburgh on 4 August 1937.

Publications

Elementary Physics (1924) co-written with fellow teacher James Tudor Cundall

Family

He was married to Helen Gifford.

References

1872 births
1937 deaths
Amateur meteorologists
Alumni of the University of Glasgow
Alumni of the University of Cambridge
Fellows of the Royal Society of Edinburgh
Scottish mountain climbers